MRY may refer to:

 Maryport railway station, England (National Rail station code MRY)
 Monongahela Railway, Pennsylvania and West Virginia, US
 MRY, Amtrak station code for Monterey, California, US
 Monterey Regional Airport, California, US (IATA airport code MRY)